Jemma Dallender (born 4 June 1988) is an English film and television actress.

Life and career
Dallender earned a Musical Theater degree from the Arts Educational School in London. Her first television role was a three-episode stint in the soap opera, Hollyoaks, in 2012. This was soon followed by her first lead role in a film, I Spit on Your Grave 2 (2013). Dallender has continued to appear in TV series, including Casualty (2014) and I Live with Models (2015), as well as a string of films—most notably, Contract to Kill (2016) and Armed (2018).

Partial filmography
 Hollyoaks (TV series, 2012) – Katie, 3 episodes
 Community (Film, 2012) – Isabelle
 I Spit on Your Grave 2 (Film, 2013) – Katie Carter
 Taken: The Search for Sophie Parker (TV film, 2013) – Janie Hillman
 Casualty (TV series, 2014) – Caitlin Conlon, 1 episode
 The Mirror (Film, 2014) – Jemma
 I Live with Models (TV series, 2015) – Nancy, 1 episode
 Contract to Kill (Film, 2016) – Zara Hayek
 Pop Music High (Web series, 2017) – Farrah, 4 episodes
 Tails of the Blue (Web series, 2017) – Queen Manchester, 2 episodes
 The Executioners (Film, 2018) – Belle
 Armed (Film, 2018) – Grace
 Daddy's Girl (Film, 2018) – Zoe
 TactiCOOL Reloads (Short Film 2018)
 Disappearance (Film, 2019) – Cecile
 Strain 100 (Film, 2020) – Jesse

References

External links

1988 births
English actresses
Actresses from London
English expatriates in the United States
21st-century English actresses
Living people